Argyrotaenia cupreographa is a species of moth of the family Tortricidae. It is found in Veracruz, Mexico.

References

C
Endemic Lepidoptera of Mexico
Moths described in 2000